The Pearson 26 is a family of American sailboats, that was designed by William Shaw and first built in 1970.

Production
The design was built by Pearson Yachts in the United States starting in 1970 and ending in 1983. The Pearson 28 was one of the company's most successful designs. A total of 1,750 of the base design were built, plus 300 of the Daysailor/Weekender and One-Design variants, for a total of 2,050 examples built.

Design
The Pearson 26 family of designs are all a small recreational keelboats, built predominantly of fiberglass with balsa-cored decks and with wood trim. They all have a masthead sloop rig, raked stem, vertical transom, an internally-mounted spade-type rudder controlled by a tiller and a fixed swept fin keel.

The design is equipped with a transom well to mount a small outboard motor for docking and maneuvering. The outboard's fuel tank is mounted in a dedicated locker.

Accommodations include a double "V"-berth in the forepeak, with a double folding door. A translucent hatch over the berth provides lights and ventilation. A main cabin dinette table converts to a double berth and there is also a settee berth, for a total of sleeping space for five people. The galley is arranged on both sides of the cabin, with the sink on the port side and optional stove on the starboard. A cooler can be mounted under the companionway ladder. The optional head is mounted on the port side.

Other features include an anchor locker, two winches for the jibsheets, four fixed portlights and an adjustable backstay, plus genoa tracks.

Variants

Pearson 26
This model was introduced in 1970 and produced until 1983, with 1,750 built. It displaces  and carries  of iron ballast. The boat has a PHRF racing average handicap of 210 with a high of 213 and low of 210.
Pearson 26W or Weekender and Daysailor
This model was introduced in 1975, built until 1983  and has a longer cockpit and shorter coach house. It has the same rigging as the 26, but lighter displacement. It displaces  and carries  of ballast. The boat has a PHRF racing average handicap of 213 with a high of 219 and low of 210.
Pearson 26 One-Design
This model was introduced in 1978, built until 1983 and is a variant of the "W" version for one-design racing. It displaces  and carries  of ballast.

Operational history
John Kretschmer of Sailing magazine reviewed the Pearson 26 in detail in August 2001, in a used boat review, as the design had been out of production for 18 years at the time. He noted "The Pearson 26 has a roomy, relatively comfortable cockpit for three or four adults...the Weekender and One-Design have slightly larger cockpits. All boats came with tiller steering, although I am sure somewhere in the world there is a 26 retrofitted with wheel steering...There is not much of a bridgedeck-basically just a sill-but this is not a boat intended for offshore sailing. The cockpit seats are low and visibility from the helm over the deckhouse is not great, especially if you're short. The tradeoff is more room below and a drier boat...Few people buy the Pearson 26 for its spacious accommodations below. However, the interior plan is well-thought-out, and the boat has more room than you might think. Dropping below, the first thing you'll notice is the headroom, about 5 feet, 10 inches by my estimate...The P26 needs a headsail, since performance is marginal under main alone, and a large 130- to 150-percent genoa can be carried upwind with a full main in winds to about 15 knots. At that point shortening up the headsail flattens the boat and keeps the speed up. Most owners tie a reef in the main as the apparent wind inches toward 20 knots. The P26 handles well off the wind, and several owners describe surfing downwind at near double-digit speeds...The Pearson 26 is an ideal boat to test the waters, so to speak, to see if sailing is indeed something you might enjoy. If you find you can't get enough time on the water, the P26 is not a boat you will quickly outgrow. It pleases on a variety of levels.

See also
List of sailing boat types

Related development
Pearson 28

Similar sailboats
Beneteau First 26
Beneteau First 265
C&C 26
C&C 26 Wave
Contessa 26
Dawson 26
Discovery 7.9
Grampian 26
Herreshoff H-26
Hunter 26
Hunter 26.5
Hunter 260
Hunter 270
MacGregor 26
Mirage 26
Nash 26
Nonsuch 26
Outlaw 26
Paceship PY 26
Parker Dawson 26
Sandstream 26
Tanzer 26
Yamaha 26

References

External links

Keelboats
1970s sailboat type designs
Sailing yachts
Sailboat type designs by William Shaw
Sailboat types built by Pearson Yachts